GABA type A receptor associated protein like 1 is a protein that in humans is encoded by the GABARAPL1 gene.

References

Further reading